Fingertips is the second studio album by Australian pub rock band The Cockroaches. It was released in October 1988 and peaked at number 32 on the Australian ARIA Chart.

Track listing

Charts

References

1988 albums
Mushroom Records albums
The Cockroaches albums